Inositol-hexakisphosphate kinase (ATP:1D-myo-inositol-hexakisphosphate phosphotransferase) is an enzyme with systematic name ATP:1D-myo-inositol-hexakisphosphate 5-phosphotransferase. This enzyme catalyses the following chemical reaction

 (1) ATP + 1D-myo-inositol hexakisphosphate(Phytic acid)  ADP + 1D-myo-inositol 5-diphosphate 1,2,3,4,6-pentakisphosphate
 (2) ATP + 1D-myo-inositol 1,3,4,5,6-pentakisphosphate  ADP + 1D-myo-inositol diphosphate tetrakisphosphate (isomeric configuration unknown)

Three mammalian isoforms are known to exist.

See also 
 IHPK1
 IHPK2

References

External links 
 

EC 2.7.4